Klingenberg may refer to:

Places
 
Klingenberg am Main, a town in Bavaria, Germany 
Klingenberg, Saxony, a municipality in Saxony, Germany 
Klingenberg (Elverum), a village in Elverum, Norway
the German name for Zvíkov Castle, Czech Republic

People
 
Alf Klingenberg (1867–1944), Norwegian pianist 
Fritz Klingenberg (1912–1945), German Waffen-SS officer 
Johannes Benedictus Klingenberg (1817–1882), Norwegian military officer and engineer 
Meghan Klingenberg (born 1988), American soccer/association-football player
Odd Sverressøn Klingenberg (1871–1944), Mayor of Trondheim, Norway 1911–1916
Olaf Sverressøn Klingenberg (1886–1968), Norwegian politician
Sverre Sverressøn Klingenberg (1882–1958), Norwegian engineer and politician
Wilhelm Klingenberg (1924–2010), German mathematician